Antiblemma acrosema is a moth of the family Noctuidae first described by Paul Mabille in 1900. It is native to Madagascar.

References
Mabille, P. (1900). "Lepidoptera nova malgassica et africana". Annales de la Société Entomologique de France. No. 68 (1899): 734.

Catocalinae
Moths of Madagascar
Moths of Africa